It Happened in Mexico (Spanish: Sucedió en México) is a 1958 Mexican musical film directed by Ramón Pereda and starring María Antonieta Pons, Joaquín Cordero and Carmelita González.

The film's sets were designed by the art director Jorge Fernández.

Cast
 Luis Aguilar 
 José Baviera 
 Lola Beltrán 
 Antonio Bribiesca
 Sara Cabrera 
 Humberto Canos
 Manuel Casanueva 
 Joaquín Cordero 
 Orquesta de Ingeniería 
 Carmelita González 
 Manolo 
 Raúl Meraz 
 José Peña
 Ignacio Peón 
 María Antonieta Pons
 Silvestre 
 Cuco Sánchez 
 Tabaquito 
 Trío Avileño 
 Mariachi Vargas 
 Nora Veryán

References

Bibliography 
 Emilio García Riera. Historia documental del cine mexicano: 1957-1958. Universidad de Guadalajara, 1992.

External links 
 

1958 films
1958 musical films
Mexican musical films
1950s Spanish-language films
Films directed by Ramón Pereda
Films scored by Manuel Esperón
1950s Mexican films